Stuart H. Harris is an English author of books and articles about the internet, and internet consultant, now living in California, United States. He is a computer professional, an expert on IRC and has written a book on the subject, IRC Survival Guide: Talk to the World with Internet Relay Chat, published in 1995 by Addison-Wesley. He is also a performer with three years experience as a semi-professional actor on the festival circuit, two years as a professional in London and in provincial repertory theatre, and further experience as a director in television. The aforementioned extensive cross-disciplinary experience motivated Harris to explore the potential of creating a Shakespeare performance online; namely, a contemporary production of Shakespeare's Hamlet known as Hamnet.

Internet relay chat
Harris has written several works on the use of IRC (internet relay chat) and other internet mediums. His best-known book is IRC Survival Guide: Talk to the World with Internet Relay Chat. In 1995 when the book was published, IRC was the latest in a fast-growing line of communication technologies. The downside of IRC was the complicated language required to create commands (actions). However, Harris' book was written with the intention of using five simple commands to make the most of an otherwise complicated client, for those who have no background in computer or internet programming.

The Hamnet Players 

The Hamnet Players introduced Harris' idea of Internet-based theatre on 12 December 1993 in their performance of the 80-line script adaption, "Hamnet"; on 6 February 1994, featuring the Royal Shakespeare Company's Ian Taylor as the principal character. A follow-up performance entitled "PCbeth: an IBM clone of Macbeth" was created, with a  world premier  on the date of stimulus playwright Shakespeare's 430th birthday, 23 April 1994. PCbeth consisted of a 160-line pastiche, which instigated theuse in virtual performances of  images via JPEG files offered to participants with the capability to receive and exhibit them. The production was restaged on 10 July 1994, accommodating VIP guest stars and several audio effects. 

Following this, the company adapted American playwright Tennessee William's A Streetcar Named Desire into the IRC-revised version An IRC Channel Named Desire. The production was staged twice: on 30 October 1994, and on 12 February 1995.

Use of the name The Hamnet Players suggests Stuart Harris' intention was to create a virtual repertory theatre company, which would become steadily more established over the course of time, and several productions. However, although Harris found it beneficial to cast several regular virtual actors, who formed the foundations of the players, and supported its intentions, the collaboration better resembled an ever-expanding and interchanging assemblage of enthusiasts than one perpetually definite troupe. As such, The Hamlet Players generally experience frequent cast turnovers.

Founded in 1993, the online company's name resonates culturally in several ways; relating not simply to the clear play on the original script's title of Hamlet, but, additionally, to the colloquial English term for an overzealous actor – a "ham". Stuart Harris in addition considered the potential "mixed reality" performance's wide possible levels of audience accessibility, regardless of financial or locational constraints; because the name "Hamnet Players" can also be linked to the term "pirate" or "ham" radio: unregulated channels of radio communication(made popular in the western world in the 1950s and 60s), operated by amateur broadcasters outside of the legal broadcast network; consequently enabling Hamnet's staging to also be linked to contemporary "hacker culture".  The basis of IRC has all the foundations for any performance- users can choose the name by which they want to be known, and there are many hundreds of thousands of users who choose not to chat but to simply watch and read what goes on. Therefore, using character names such as "Ophelia" and "Hamlet", as well as using HTML actions, gives the potential to introduce a very considerable alternative to traditional live performance platforms.

Harris' intention for development of The Hamnet Players' work was to ultimately create web-based formats of every stage of theatrical production, in addition to performance; including casting calls, auditions and callbacks; the entire rehearsal process; marketing and production critique.

In her paper "Curtain Time 20:00 GMT; Experiments with Virtual Theater on Internet Relay Chat", Brenda Danet says this of Stuart Harris' version of Hamlet, Hamnet: "...gross reduction of the length of the text and caricaturization of plot and action, along with transformation of hallowed Renaissance poetry into late 20th century colloquial prose and even lowly slang ... transform the play into a kind of typed Punch and Judy show"

Live or mediated performance

"Since all participants in an IRC conversation may choose whatever nickname they wish to be known by... and since an IRC channel may contain many people who watch, but contribute nothing... some of the elements of traditional theatre are [still] there."
(Harris, 1995, 500)

Live or mediated performance is based on the idea that Mediated performance is one that is recorded or broadcast. The technique used by the Hamnet Players, initiated by Stuart Harris, is that each of the cast's script lines are numbered and no one has the full script apart from the production team. In this way, not even the players fully know what will unfold until the live chat performance.

Stuart Harris drew on his experience of IRC to create a virtual theatre company focused on creating "mixed reality" cyberperformance. One of the advantages of performing entirely online was the ability for company members to be in cross-country or even internationally varied locations simultaneously—members could rehearse at any time, from anywhere. Following around a year of online experimentation, and directed by Harris, the cybertheatre company performed a contemporary script-based version of Shakespeare's Hamlet specifically adapted for IRC in December 1993. Broadcast from an IRC channel based in San Diego, the production appeared on computer screens across the world; and was performed for a second time in February with RSC member Ian Taylor as the principal character. The usual script-based format of IRC, and its use of dialogue as the primary communication method, present the facility as an ideal platform for performing text-based drama experimentally. The online potential for spontaneity and improvisation was both realised and cursed, however, when a bot unintentionally killed Hamlet halfway through the production.
Mary L. Anglin

Advantageously, despite Stuart Harris' focus on spontaneity, the director's choice of IRC as performance format allowed copies of the production to be documented via online performance logs; granting preservation of improvised lines, character depictions and described actions offered by actors, and textual cues(such as emoticons) regularly used in net communications as a replacement for facial and vocal cues relied on in face-to-face conversation.

Superseding developments

Subsequently, similar cyberperformance groups inspired by his project include:

  The Plaintext Players (founded by Antoinette LaFarge who played Blanche in the second performance of "An IRC Channel Named #Desire"): performed in MOO's and mixed reality spaces. Earliest performance: "Xmas" (1994).
  ParkBench (Nina Sobell; Emily Hartzell): collaborative performance and artwork space, incorporating live video with a web browser UI( User Interface) (1994).
  Desktop Theatre (Adriene Jenik; Lisa Brenneis): waitingforgodot.com (1997).
  Avatar Body Collision (Helen Varley Jamieson; Karla Ptacek; Vicki Smith; Leena Saarinen): Online performance collaboration featuring use of internet-based cyberperformance software programme "UpStage" (2002).

Published works

Major television documentaries

See also
 Cyberformance
 Desktop Theater
 Avatar Body Collision
 Antoinette LaFarge

References

External links

 Personal memoir

Year of birth missing (living people)
Living people
English emigrants to the United States
British computer specialists
Internet Relay Chat
British male stage actors
Internet pioneers
Digital art